Morro da Pedreira Environmental Protection Area is a protected area within the Cerrado biome, located in Minas Gerais, Brazil.

Location

It is administered by the Chico Mendes Institute for Biodiversity Conservation.
It contains all or part of the municipalities of Conceição do Mato Dentro, Itabira, Itambé do Mato Dentro, Jaboticatubas, Nova União, Morro do Pilar, Santana do Riacho and Taquaraçu de Minas in the state of Minas Gerais.

Conservation

The environmental protection area is classed as IUCN protected area category V, protected landscape/seascape.
The purpose is to preserve biological diversity, control the impact of human occupation and ensure sustainable use of natural resources.
Protected species in the area include maned wolf (Chrysocyon brachyurus) and ocelot (Leopardus pardalis mitis).

Notes

Sources

Environmental protection areas of Brazil
Protected areas of Minas Gerais